Bruce Blainey (born 12 April 1939) is  a former Australian rules footballer who played with Richmond in the Victorian Football League (VFL).

Notes

External links 
		

Living people
1939 births
Australian rules footballers from Victoria (Australia)
Richmond Football Club players